The Municipality of Čegrane in Polog Statistical Region, North Macedonia, was formed on 18 December 1996 and merged in 2004 into the Municipality of Gostivar.

Demographics
According to the last national census from 2002 this municipality has 12310  inhabitants.
Ethnic groups in the municipality include:
 Albanians = 12,075 (97,65%)
 Macedonians = 235 (2,35%)

Inhabited places
The municipality has 4 inhabited places,4 villages.

References

Former municipalities of North Macedonia
Gostivar Municipality